Novaport Holding is a Russian transport company which operates regional airports, and holds interests in the operation of several other airports.

History 
Before the official creation of Novaport, the company's owner bought a 38% stake in Tolmachevo Airport in 2004 and 48% of Barnaul Airport's operator. The airport operator Novaport was created in 2007 and acquired 100% of Kadala Airport's operator Aerochita.

In March 2008, Novaport announced a $1 billion budget to grow its portfolio of regional airports in the next 5 years. That same year, Novaport acquired 69% of Chelyabinsk Airport and 43% of Narimanovo Airport's operator.

In September 2011, Novaport finalized the 51% purchase of the Tolmachevo Airport through its Moscow-based subsidiary AeroService Complex, bringing its participation to 68%. AeroService Complex then sold those 68% in August 2011 to Cyprus-based TS Trans Siberia, an offshore company also related to Roman Trotsanko, the owner of Novaport.

In November 2015, Novaport bought out the Murmansk Airport from its former owner, Gazprom Oil, with the aim to develop flights of the low-cost airline Podeba to the airport. In May 2016, Novaport presented its plan to build a new terminal to reach 1.7 million passengers by 2030 (from 751,300 in 2015).

In July 2016, Novaport bought the Khrabrovo Airport and the Mineralnye Vody Airport from Aeroinvest.

In February 2017, Novaport invested $500K in the online service Grabr that provides a solution to buy any goods abroad by hiring a traveler.

In March 2017, Novaport expressed its interest in acquiring 100% of the Belgrade Airport.

In August 2017, Novaport began the discussion to purchase Omsk-Fyodorovka Airport, however in October 2017, Airports of Regions also made an interest to take part in the airport's construction.

Operations 

Airports partially owned and/or managed by Novaport.

Novaport Holding is one of the largest regional airport operators in Russia with 16 airports. Novaport serviced more than 21.6mln passengers in 2018 and is leading Russia's drive to enhance regional connectivity across the country's vast geography and multitude of time zones. As of December 2018 it holds or operates a major equity stake in 14 regional airports in Novosibirsk, Chelyabinsk, Volgograd, Tomsk Astrakhan, Chita, Tyumen, Perm, Murmansk, Kemerovo, Kaliningrad, Mineralnye Vody, Ulan-Ude, Vladikavkaz and possesses minority interest (48-49%) in Barnaul and Stavropol airports.

Governance 
Novaport Holding is owned by Russian billionaire Roman Trotsenko,  the former advisor to the head of Rosneft. Novaport is a subsidiary of Roman Trotsenko's AEON Corporation, who is also the president of Russia's state-run United Shipbuilding Corporation. AEON Corporation also owns assets in the shipbuilding, telecommunications and real estate sectors.

The deputy CEO of the company is Anna Varshavskaya.

References

External links

 
Airport operators
Transport companies of Russia
Holding companies of Russia
Companies based in Moscow
Holding companies established in 2007
Transport companies established in 2007
2007 establishments in Russia